FEAT (pronounced "F-E-A-T") is the first studio album by American record production duo the Hood Internet. It was released on Decon on October 2, 2012. It features guest appearances from A.C. Newman, Cadence Weapon, and Class Actress, among others. Music videos were created for "Won't Fuck Us Over", "One for the Record Books", and "More Fun". The remix album, FEAT Remixes, was released on December 18, 2012.

Critical reception

At Metacritic, which assigns a weighted average score out of 100 to reviews from mainstream critics, the album received an average score of 54, based on 6 reviews, indicating "mixed or average reviews".

Jordan Sargent of Pitchfork gave the album a 3.0 out of 10, writing, "An album of original productions was a logical next step for a group that's been slowly easing its way out of mashup purgatory for years, but FEAT makes it clear that the Hood Internet were not ready." Meanwhile, Amanda Koellner of Consequence of Sound wrote, "It's doubtful that the duo will ever stop mashing up, but it's a damn good time watching them try something new."

Greg Kot of Chicago Tribune placed it at number 3 on the "Top Chicago Indie Albums" year-end list.

Track listing

Personnel
Credits adapted from liner notes.

 The Hood Internet – production, mixing
 Class Actress – guest appearance (1)
 Cadence Weapon – guest appearance (1)
 A.C. Newman – guest appearance (2)
 Sims – guest appearance (2)
 Psalm One – guest appearance (3)
 Tobaxxo – guest appearance (3)
 Isaiah Toothtaker – guest appearance (4)
 Showyousuck – guest appearance (4)
 Zambri – guest appearance (5)
 Hooray for Earth – guest appearance (5)
 Junior Pande – guest appearance (5, 7)
 Annie Hart – guest appearance (6)
 BBU – guest appearance (6)
 Donwill – guest appearance (7)
 My Gold Mask – guest appearance (7)
 The Rosebuds – guest appearance (8)
 Astronautalis – guest appearance (8)
 Kenan Bell – guest appearance (9)
 The Chain Gang of 1974 – guest appearance (9)
 Millionyoung – guest appearance (9)
 Kid Static – guest appearance (10)
 Slow Witch – guest appearance (10)
 Kleenex Girl Wonder – guest appearance (10)
 Greg Magers – mixing
 Paul Gold – mastering
 Julia Lee Meyer – artwork

References

External links
 

2012 debut albums
Decon albums
The Hood Internet albums